The National Basketball Championship is a men's national level basketball tournament, held by the Basketball Federation of India, governing body of basketball in India. The competition is contested among the regional state teams affiliated under Basketball Federation of India.

2019 edition 
2019 marked the 70th time, the Indian Senior National Basketball Championship was held. It took place in the Guru Nanak Indoor Stadium. 

Punjab beat arch-rivals Tamil Nadu 93-75.
The frontcourt of Amritpal Singh, Amjyot Singh and Princepal Singh was too much for Tamil Nadu, where Jeevanantham Pandi and Aravind Annadurai were among the top adversaries. Punjab also featured the backcourt duo of Arshpreet Bhullar and Rajveer Singh, who scored many points from long distance.

In the Semifinals, Punjab’s team secured a 79-67 victory over Uttarakhand, whereas Tamil Nadu secured a narrow 65-63 win against Indian Railways.

Championships

Notable players
- Set a club record or won an individual award as a professional player

- Played at least one official international match for his senior national team at any time

See also
Basketball in India
3BL
UBA Pro Basketball League
Indian National Basketball League
Elite Pro Basketball League

References

External links

Basketball competitions in India
1950 establishments in India